Donald Quayle Cannon (born 1936) is a retired professor at Brigham Young University who specializes in Latter-day Saint history, particularly early Latter-day Saint history and international Latter-day Saint history.

As a young man, Cannon was a missionary for the Church of Jesus Christ of Latter-day Saints (LDS Church) in Germany.  Cannon earned his bachelor's and master's degrees at the University of Utah. Cannon holds a Ph.D. from Clark University. In the late 1960s, he taught at the University of Southern Maine.

In the LDS Church he has served as a bishop and branch president.

Among other works, Cannon was one of the editors of the Encyclopedia of Latter-day Saint History and of the Historical Atlas of Mormonism. He has also been an editor for works in the Regional Studies in Latter-day Saint History series.

Works 
 Donald Q. Cannon, Larry E. Dahl, and John W. Welch, “The Restoration of Major Doctrines through Joseph Smith: The Godhead, Mankind, and the Creation,” Ensign, January 1989, p. 27

The Nauvoo Legion in Illinois: A History of the Mormon Militia, 1841-1846 (2010) with Richard E. Bennett and Susan Easton Black.
 Mapping Mormonism: An Atlas of Latter-day Saint History (2012) with Brandon S. Plewe (editor-in-chief) and S. Kent Brown and Richard H. Jackson

References

External links 
 
 

1936 births
20th-century Mormon missionaries
American Latter Day Saint writers
American Mormon missionaries in Germany
American leaders of the Church of Jesus Christ of Latter-day Saints
Brigham Young University faculty
Cannon family
Clark University alumni
Historians of the Latter Day Saint movement
Latter Day Saints from Massachusetts
Latter Day Saints from Utah
Living people
University of Utah alumni